Swimming Pool Gruž or Jug Swimming Pool is a swimming pool in Dubrovnik, Croatia.

History

Gruž Swimming Pool was opened on 4 July 1961. During the 1990s, the swimming pool got a temporary roof and in 2003 the actual retractable roof was installed.

References

External links
 Gradski bazen u Gružu at sportskiobjektidu.hr 
 USKORO REKONSTRUKCIJA JUGOVOG BAZENA Dubrovnik dobiva prvi muzej vaterpola at slobodnadalmacija.hr 

Sports venues in Croatia
Swimming venues in Croatia
Sports venues completed in 1961
Buildings and structures in Dubrovnik